Musi Banyuasin Regency is a regency of South Sumatra (or Sumatra Selatan) province, in Indonesia.

The administrative centre of Musi Banyuasin Regency is the town of Sekayu.

Geography 
The regency, which covers fifteen percent of the area of South Sumatera Province, is located between 1.3° to 4° South latitude and from 103° to 104°40′ East longitude.
It is bordered to the north by Jambi Province, to the south by the new Penukal Abab Lematang Ilir Regency, to the west by Musi Rawas Regency and North Musi Rawas Regency, and to the east by Banyuasin Regency.

Administrative districts
As at 2010, Musi Banyuasin Regency was subdivided into eleven districts (kecamatan), but a further three districts were created in 2011 (Lawang Wetan, Babat Supat and Tungkal Jaya), and another one in 2017 (Jirak Jaya). These are all listed below with their revised areas (in Km²) and their populations at the 2010 Census and the 2020 Census. The table also includes the locations of the district administrative centres, the number of administrative villages (rural desa and uban kelurahan) in each district, and its post codes.

Notes: (a) the population of Lawang Wetan District in 2010 is included in the figure for Babat Toman District, from which it was cut in 2011. (b) the population of Jirak Jaya District in 2010, and the number of villages and post code, is included in the figures for Sungai Keruh District, from which it was cut in 2017. (c) the population of Babat Supat District in 2010 is included in the figure for Sungai Lilin District, from which it was cut in 2011. (d) the population of Tungkal Jaya District in 2010 is included in the figure for Bayung Lencir District, from which it was cut in 2011.

Soil 
Musi Banyuasin Regency consists of 4 kinds of soil:

 Organosol: along the swamp and in the plain area
 Clay Loam: see Organosol
 Alluvial: along the Musi River
 Pudzolik: in the hilly area

Climate 
Musi Banyuasin Regency has tropic and wet season with variation of rainfall between 39.00 and 297.25 mm, for the year 2007 December has highest rank of rainfalls. Rain days in 2007 tend to vary between 2.75 and 15.25 days with January having highest rank of rain days.

External links 
 
 Map of South Sumatra province

References

Regencies of South Sumatra